This article describes the party affiliations of leaders of each member-state represented in the European Council during the year 2007. The list below gives the political party that each head of government, or head of state, belongs to at the national level, as well as the European political alliance to which that national party belongs. The states are listed from most to least populous. More populous states have greater influence in the council, in accordance with the system of Qualified Majority Voting.



Summary

List of leaders (1 January 2007)

 Supported by PD Prior to 14 October, Prodi had officially aligned himself only with his The Olive Tree coalition rather than any member-party, but he had previously been a member of Democracy is Freedom – The Daisy's ancestor-party and was honorary president of its European parent, the EDP. DIKO's MEP is a member of the Alliance of Liberals and Democrats for Europe group in the European Parliament, but the party is not formally attached to any pan-European organization.

Changes

Affiliation

 Supported by PD

Office-holder only

National party changes
On 14 October, Prodi's governing The Olive Tree coalition of parties merged into a single Democratic Party. The successor party had yet to determine whether it would continue Daisy's EDP membership; Prodi remained aligned on an individual basis with the EDP.

See also
Presidency of the Council of the European Union

External links
Council of the European Union (official website)

Lists of parties in the European Council